The Herbularium du Morvan (500 m2), more formally known as the Herbularium du parc naturel régional du Morvan, is a botanical garden with arboretum located at the Maison du Parc in the Parc naturel régional du Morvan, Saint-Brisson, Nièvre, Burgundy, France. It is open year-round; admission is free.

The garden was established in 1987, inspired by medieval medicinal herb gardens but with a broader view encompassing plants native to the Morvan. It contains about 170 labeled species within 32 boxwood-edged beds (15 m2 each) as follows:

 characteristic plants of the Morvan (ten beds)
 climatic influences of the Morvan, with rare species (three beds)
 botanical miscellany (three beds)
 medicinal plants from the Morvan (six beds)
 cultivated food plants (three beds)
 local traditions (four beds)
 common plants and folk medicine (three beds)

Its arboretum contains a number of labeled specimens as well as a pond.

See also 
 List of botanical gardens in France

References 
 Parc naturel régional du Morvan
 Petit Futé entry (French)
 Parcs et Jardins entry (French)
 Je Decouvre La France entry (French)
 BaLaDO.fr entry (French)
 1001 Fleurs entry (French)
 Vision Bourgogne entry (French) 

Gardens in Nièvre
Botanical gardens in France